Mady Rahl (3 January 1915 – 29 August 2009) was a German stage and film actress.

Born Edith Gertrud Meta Raschke in Neukölln, now part of Berlin, Rahl trained as an actress and dancer. In 1935 she made her stage debut in Leipzig under the direction of Douglas Sirk and started her film career in 1936 with the movie The Mysterious Mister X. With her role in the circus drama Truxa (1937), Rahl became known to a wider audience. After the war, she sang with her friend Elfreide Datzig for the USO. She ultimately appeared in approximately 90 movies, several of them for UFA. In later years, she appeared frequently on television, while also pursuing her career in the theatre. She was also the German voice of many cartoon characters and of Lucille Ball.

Rahl's first marriage was to financier Theodor Reimers, her second was to producer Wilhem Sperber, and her third was to architect Werner Bürkle.  All three marriages ended in divorce, and she had no children.  Late in life she painted in the Impressionist style.

Whilst she died of cancer, Rahl was also almost blind and suffering from dementia. She lived in a retirement home in Munich, where her minder  was Thomas Speyerer.

Her grave is in the Nordfriedhof Cemetery in Munich (plot 178-U-66), where her sister Ellen had been buried in 1995.

Selected filmography
 The Mysterious Mister X (1936)
 Truxa (1937)
 The Irresistible Man (1937)
 Zweimal zwei im Himmelbett (1937) (alongside Georg Alexander, Paul Henckels and Carola Höhn)
 To New Shores (1937) (Zarah Leander, Willy Birgel)
 Eine Nacht im Mai (1938) (Marika Rökk, Viktor Staal, Oskar Sima)
 Hello Janine! (1939) (Marika Rökk, Johannes Heesters)
 My Wife Theresa (1942) (Elfie Mayerhofer, Hans Söhnker)
 Beloved World (1942)
 Love Me (1942)
 Tonelli (1943)
 Sieben Briefe (1944) (O. W. Fischer)
 Somewhere in Berlin (1946)
 Tell the Truth (1946)
 Night of the Twelve (1949)
 The Blue Straw Hat (1949)
 Everything for the Company (1950)
 One Night's Intoxication (1951)
 Border Post 58 (1951)
 Scandal at the Embassy (1950)
 Eyes of Love (1951) (Käthe Gold, René Deltgen)
 The Lady in Black (1951) (Paul Hartmann, Rudolf Prack)
 The Blue and White Lion (1952)
 Prisoners of Love (1954) (Curd Jürgens, Bernhard Wicki)
 Three from Variety (1954)
 The Tour Guide of Lisbon (1956)
 Imperial and Royal Field Marshal (1956)
 War of the Maidens (1957) (Gerlinde Locker, Oskar Sima, Kurt Heintel)
 The Heart of St. Pauli (1957) (Hans Albers, Gert Fröbe)
  (1957) (Hans Moser, Paul Hörbiger)
 The Copper (1958)
  (1958) (Willy Fritsch, Karin Dor)
 Stefanie (1958)
 Arena of Fear (1959)
 Darkness Fell on Gotenhafen (1960)
 The Forger of London (1961) (an Edgar Wallace movie)
 Hochzeit am Neusiedler See (1963) (Rolf Olsen, Gertraud Jesserer, Udo Jürgens, Rocco Granata)
 The White Spider (1963)
 Holiday in St. Tropez (1964)
 The Hound of Blackwood Castle (1968)
 Karl May (1974) (biopic directed by Hans-Jürgen Syberberg)
  (1977) (video title Ibiza - Der Tod kommt nur bei blauem Himmel)
  (1979) (Wolfgang Kieling, Hannelore Elsner; based on a novel by Martin Walser)
 Die Wicherts von nebenan (TV series) (1986)
 Die glückliche Familie (TV series) (1987)
 The Aggression (1988)
 Polizeiruf 110 (TV series): episode "Vater unser" (2004)

References

External links
 
 Photographs of Mady Rahl

1915 births
2009 deaths
Deaths from cancer in Germany
20th-century German actresses
German film actresses
German television actresses
Burials at the Nordfriedhof (Munich)